ʻAṣmāʼ bint Marwān ( "Asma, daughter of Marwan") a female Arab poet said to have lived in Medina in 7th-century Arabia. Early writers of Muhammad's biography claimed that she was murdered for her agitating against Muhammad.

Islamic sources

Family and death
The story of Asma bint Marwan and her death appears in the works of both Ibn Ishaq and Ibn Sa'd. According to these accounts, her family viewed Muhammad and his followers as unwelcome interlopers in Medina. After the Muslim victory over the Quraysh in Mecca in 624 in the Battle of Badr, (17 Ramadan AH 2 in the ancient (intercalated) Arabic calendar (16 December) – see Expedition of Dhat al-Riqa#Discrepancy in dates – a number of Muhammad's opponents were killed. In response, she composed poems that publicly criticized the local tribesmen who converted to Islam and allied with Muhammad, calling for his death. In her poems, she also ridiculed Medinians for obeying a chief not of their kin.

Ibn Ishaq mentions that bint Marwan also displayed disgust after the Medinian Abu Afak was killed for inciting rebellion against Muhammad. The poem said: "do you expect good from (Muhammad) after the killing of your chiefs" and asked: "Is there no man of pride who would attack him by surprise/ And cut off the hopes of those who expect aught from him?" Upon hearing the poem, Muhammad then called for her death in turn, saying "Who will rid me of Marwan's daughter?" Umayr bin Adiy al-Khatmi, a blind man belonging to the same tribe as Asma bint Marwan's husband, Banu Khatma, responded that he would. He crept into her room in the dark of night where she was sleeping with her five children, with her infant child close to her bosom. Umayr removed the child from Asma's breast and killed her.

On the other hand Al-Waqidi's and Ibn Sa'd's accounts differ substantially from that of Ibn Ishaq. In these the killing of Asma bint Marwan does not stem from a statement by Muhammad as he is described as being in Badr during this time and not in Medina. Instead, according to al-Waqidi, a man named ʿUmayr bin ʿAdī, decided individually to kill Asma bint Marwan.

Ibn Ishaq's account
Ibn Ishaq collected oral traditions about the life of Muhammad, some of which survive through the writings of Ibn Hisham and Ibn Jarir al-Tabari.

He narrates that in response to the killing of Abu Afak, Asma recited the following poem (originally Arabic, here using the translation by Alfred Guillaume):

On hearing these verses, Muhammad is reported to have said: "Who will rid me of Marwan's daughter?" Umayr bin Adiy al-Khatmi, who in turn overheard this, went to her house the same night and killed her.

The sources appear to be conflicted on whether this was done on Muhammad's orders or not, but the version as recorded by Ibn Ishaq goes on to say that the following morning, Umayr came told Muhammad what he had done and the prophet responded: "You have helped God and His apostle, O Umayr!" And when asked what consequences he might have to bear, Muhammad said, "Two goats won't butt their heads about her."

When Umayr returned to the Banu Khatma, the tribe of which both Asma and Umayr were members, he then openly declared: "I have killed bint Marwan, O sons of Khatma. Withstand me if you can; don't keep me waiting." This was apparently the first open statement of allegiance to the Muslim cause by a member of that tribe, and more of its members became Muslims shortly after.

Ibn Sa'd's account
This account is found in Ibn Sa'd's Kitāb al-ṭabaqāt al-Kubrā and is given the rank of Mawḍūʻ, fabricated, by hadith scholars including Al-Albani, Majdi, and Al-Jawzi.

Hadith scholar views on the authenticity of the story
Classical and post-classical hadith scholars have rejected the story, declaring it as fabrication (mawdu'''). They point out in their arguments against the factuality of the incident that the chains of transmission (isnads) by which the story was transmitted are all weak (daʻif) of the lowest degree (mawḍūʻ).

Ibn Ishaq's narrative
Ibn Ishaq's Sīratu Rasūlu l-Lāh, an important early work of sīra, was composed over 100 years after Muhammad's death, using oral traditions passed down from his early followers, with a number of isnads (chains of transmission) going back to Ibn 'Abbas, a companion of Muhammad. However, the accuracy of this story for use as hadith is not completely accepted. Later scholars including Ibn ʻAdī, Ibn al-Jawzi,  Muhammad al-Bukhari, Yahya ibn Ma'een and Al-Daraqutni, have called into question the reliability of the hadith on the basis the negative academic reputation of certain individuals in the chain, including Muhammad ibn al-Hajjaj al-Lakhmi and Mujalid ibn Sa’ed, both whom were regarded by the authoritative Al-Bukhari as weak transmitters.

Ibn Sa'd's & Al-Waqidi's narrative
Al-Albani declared Ibn Sa'd's chain of transmission to be weak as well, as it includes Al-Waqidi:Ibn Sa'd → Al-Waqidi → 'Abd Allah ibn al-Harith ibn al-Fudayl → Al-Harith ibn al-Fudayl Al-Waqidi has been condemned as an untrustworthy narrator and has been frequently and severely criticized by scholars, thus his narrations have been abandoned by the majority of hadith scholars. Yahya ibn Ma'een said: "Al-Waqidi narrated 20,000 false hadith about the prophet". Al-Shafi'i, Ahmad ibn Hanbal and Al-Albani said: "Al-Waqidi is a liar" while Al-Bukhari said he didn't include a single letter by Al-Waqidi in his hadith works.

In addition, this isnad is discontinued (muʻḍal) as Al-Harith ibn al-Fudayl never met any of Muhammad's companions.

Modern assessments
Jane Smith, in her study Women, Religion and Social Change in Early Islam'' points at the high influence of poets and poetry at the time of Muhammad in Arabia. She states that assassinations of poets such as Abu Afak and Asma after Muhammad's final victory were the result of fears of "their continuing influence", and that this episode "constitutes interesting testimony of the power of their position, as well as of the recited words".

V. J. Ridgeon sees certain parallels between Khomeini's declaration of the fatwa against Salman Rushdie and the incident of Asma bint Marwan's assassination.

Some later assessments tie the episode involving Asma directly to the killing of Abu Afak. Richard Gottheil and Hartwig Hirschfeld state in the Jewish Encyclopedia that some traditionalist sources asserted that Asma was a Jewess, just as Abu Afak was a Jew, and put this fact forward "an excuse" for the killing – a fact which they in turn cast doubt on, though they also point the conflicting scholarly perspectives on the matter.

Contemporary Muslim writers respond to these charges by stating that the two stories of Asma bint Marwan and Abu Afak, they were classified by the majority of hadith scholars in history as fabricated. 
Even in the hypothetical stories, these two characters not only ridiculed, but incited against Muslims and the Prophet. "They were urging their people to rise up and fight the Muslims, and kill them, which made them direct enemies".

See also
 Umm Qirfa
 Ka'b ibn al-Ashraf
 Prophetic biography

References

Arab women
Arabic-language women poets
Assassinated people in the medieval Islamic world
Assassinated Jews
Medieval Jewish women
Medieval Jewish poets
Medieval women poets
Opponents of Muhammad
People from Medina
Poets of the early Islamic period
Pre-Islamic Arabian poets
Women in war in the Middle East
7th-century Arabian Jews
7th-century women